Wilson Rutherford "Bud" Schwenk Jr. (August 26, 1917– October 1, 1980) was a professional American football quarterback who played four seasons for the Chicago Cardinals, Cleveland Browns, Baltimore Colts, and New York Yankees.

Schwenk grew up in St. Louis, Missouri and attended Washington University in St. Louis, where he starred on the Washington University Bears football team. He set numerous college football records for passing in the 1941 season, his senior year. After college, Schwenk played one season for the Cardinals in the National Football League (NFL), before leaving to serve for three years in the United States Navy during World War II. Upon his discharge, Schwenk joined the Cleveland Browns, a team under formation in the new All-America Football Conference (AAFC). After one season with the Browns during which the team won the AAFC championship, Schwenk was traded to the Buffalo Bills and then to the Colts before the start of the 1947 season. He went on to have his best year as a player, setting a professional football record for passing attempts in a season. Despite his success, the Colts put Schwenk put out on waivers, and he was picked up by the New York Yankees, where he played for one year before leaving football.

After his playing career, Schwenk spent 30 years as an executive in St. Louis at Junior Achievement, a national nonprofit that prepares young people for the workforce. He served as the chairman of Missouri's state athletic commission in the 1970s and was on the board of the St. Louis Better Business Bureau. He was inducted into the Washington University sports hall of fame in 1991. His jersey number 42 is the only one retired by the school's football program.

High school and college career
Schwenk was a native of St. Louis, Missouri and attended the city's Beaumont High School. A three-sport athlete, he became a star halfback who both threw forward passes and ran with the ball at Washington University in St. Louis. He played for the Washington University Bears football team, starting as a junior in 1940. He set a college football record the following year by running and passing for a combined 516 yards in a single game. He surpassed a three-year-old college record for completed passes in a season later in the year, with 114. He passed and ran for a total of 1,628 yards.

Professional career

Schwenk was recruited by professional football teams and was drafted by the Chicago Cardinals of the National Football League at the end of 1941. That December, he said he had abandoned plans to play in the National Football League because of World War II. Nevertheless, he played for the Cardinals during the 1942 season. He broke the NFL record for most passes completed in his first season, although the Philadelphia Eagles' Davey O'Brien also broke the record and beat him with 146. Schwenk did not play between 1943 and 1945 as he served in the U.S. Navy during the war.

Following his discharge from the Navy, Schwenk signed with the Cleveland Browns of the new All-America Football Conference. Limited by an ankle injury, Schwenk played sparingly for the Browns in the 1946 season, substituting on occasion for quarterback Otto Graham. The Browns won the AAFC championship that year. Schwenk was traded to the Buffalo Bills for fullback Jim Thibaut early in 1947. The Bills then sent him to the Baltimore Colts in August.

With Baltimore, Schwenk had the best season of his career, passing for 2,236 yards and throwing 13 touchdowns. Down by five points in a game against the Bills in October, Schwenk threw a last second completion to Lamar Davis, who caught it but was ruled out of bounds a foot outside the end zone. Officials allowed the game clock to tick down to zero, giving Buffalo the victory as the Colts argued that it was a score. A near-riot broke out after players began shoving each other and spectators came down on the field. In November, Schwenk bested his own professional football record, set while with the Cardinals in 1942, of 295 passing attempts in a season.  The Colts, however, put him out on waivers after the season, and he was picked up by the New York Yankees. Schwenk played for the Yankees in 1948 before leaving professional football.

Later life

Schwenk began work in 1950 as the chief operating officer of the Mississippi Valley branch of Junior Achievement, a non-profit that prepares young people for the workforce. He stayed at Junior Achievement for 30 years. He engaged in civic organizations in St. Louis, and was on the board of the city's Better Business Bureau. He also was a director and founder of the Spanish Lake Bank & Trust Company. Between 1971 and 1975, he was chairman of the Missouri State Athletic Commission.

Schwenk died in 1980. He was inducted into the Washington University Sports Hall of Fame in 1991, and his number 42 jersey is the only one retired by the Washington Bears.

See also

 List of NCAA major college football yearly passing leaders
 List of NCAA major college football yearly total offense leaders

References

Bibliography

External links

1917 births
1980 deaths
American chief operating officers
American football halfbacks
American football quarterbacks
American football punters
American men's basketball players
Chicago Cardinals players
New York Yankees (AAFC) players
Cleveland Browns (AAFC) players
Baltimore Colts (1947–1950) players
Washington University Bears football players
Washington University Bears men's basketball players
Players of American football from St. Louis
Basketball players from St. Louis
United States Navy personnel of World War II